The Yorkshire Grey was a common name for public houses in England, some still survive but most have now closed or changed their name. They were named for the Yorkshire Grey Horse, a breed commonly used to pull brewery drays.

Extant public houses

Biggleswade
140 London Road, Biggleswade

Camden, London 
At the corner of Grays Inn Road and Theobald's Road in Bloomsbury, Camden, London, situated to the north of Gray's Inn. It is a Grade II listed building, built in 1877 by J. W. Brooker. The pub was established in 1676 and was historically in the county of Middlesex. The Amalgamated Society of Gentleman's Servants once met at The Yorkshire Grey inn in the late 18th century, although Hart Street is mentioned as the location and it is possibly a different pub. In 1848 it was owned by an  Oliver Waterloo King. It serves Scotch and Japanese whiskies and traditional English pub grub.

Doncaster 
Located at 16-17 Hall Gate, Doncaster.

Earl's Croome, Worcestershire 
Located on A38.

Westminster, London 
See main article Yorkshire Grey, Fitzrovia

Extinct public houses

Brentwood 
Now a Giggling Squid restaurant at 33 High Street.

Cambridge 
In the 19th century at 64 King Street

Coggeshall 
Now a dental surgery.

Croome 
Renamed The Elgar Inn.

Eltham, London 
Constructed in the 1920s on the Eltham Road (now South Circular) between Eltham and Lee. Closed in 1994 it became a McDonald's restaurant.

Portsmouth 
Corner of Guildhall Walk and Alex Rose Ln.  Grade II listed.  Now the 'Guildhall Village'

Stevenage 
A Grade II listed building at 17 High Street. Now an ASK Italian restaurant.

Sheffield 
Built in 1833 at 69 Charles Street, Sheffield, closed in 2006 and later demolished.

Winson Green, Birmingham 
Now Lokman Sofrasi a Turkish restaurant.

References

External links
Yorkshire Grey Biggleswade
Yorkshire Grey Doncaster
Yorkshire Grey London

1676 establishments in England
Buildings and structures in Bloomsbury
Pubs in the London Borough of Camden
Grade II listed buildings in the London Borough of Camden